Stone Island is an Italian luxury men's apparel and accessories brand. It was established in 1982 in Ravarino by Massimo Osti. In December 2020, Stone Island was acquired by the Italian fashion house Moncler.

History

Designer Massimo Osti founded Stone Island in 1982, initially as a secondary line to complement his principal brand C.P. Company which he had started in 1971.

In 1983 the company sold 50% of the business to GFT(Gruppo Finanziario Tessile), who acquired the rest of the company in 1991. Massimo Osti left the company in 1994, and in 1996 Paul Harvey took over as the brands designer, remaining until 2008. In 1993 GFT sold the company to Carlo Rivetti who also bought C.P. Company to form Sportswear Company SpA.

In August 2017, Stone Island sold Singaporean Sovereign wealth fund Temasek Holdings a 30% stake in its business for a yet to be disclosed sum.

In December 2020, Moncler acquired a majority stake in Stone Island for a reported €1.15 billion.

Brand

Stone Island is known for its innovative approach to fabrication through a range of dyeing techniques and surface treatments. These include Raso Gommato (1983), Thermosensitive fabric (1987), Rubber Wool (1987) and Reflective fabric (1991).

It is also recognisable by the use of a cloth badge that features a compass design and that buttons onto the upper sleeve of the left arm. Originally the patches were green edged, badges from around the year 2000 onwards became black edged. There are also a run of rarer 'white badges' which were originally made on certain jackets to celebrate the new millennium. The white badge is now apparent on jackets that use materials that Stone Island develops themselves in-house. Novel jacket designs include the "Liquid Reflective" jacket, that uses thousands of small shards of glass that reflect light.

From the mid-1990s the make has been popular in the football casual subculture in England and throughout the rest of Europe. The brand is often associated with hooliganism and can be seen in many football hooliganism based films, such as Green Street Hooligans and The Football Factory. Canadian rapper Drake is also regularly seen wearing Stone Island, and has helped popularize the brand in hip hop culture.

See also

 C.P. Company

References

External links
Official website

Clothing companies established in 1982
Italian companies established in 1982
Clothing brands of Italy
High fashion brands